Waldomiro "Waldo" Claudiano Pinto (born 22 October 1934) is a Brazilian boxer. He competed in the men's bantamweight event at the 1960 Summer Olympics. At the 1960 Summer Olympics, he received a bye in the Round of 64, then lost by decision to Oleg Grigoryev of the Soviet Union in the Round of 32.

References

External links
 

1934 births
Living people
Brazilian male boxers
Olympic boxers of Brazil
Boxers at the 1960 Summer Olympics
Boxers at the 1959 Pan American Games
Pan American Games gold medalists for Brazil
Pan American Games medalists in boxing
Sportspeople from Rio de Janeiro (city)
Bantamweight boxers
Medalists at the 1959 Pan American Games
20th-century Brazilian people
21st-century Brazilian people